Caroline Marshall Woodward (Marshall; after marriage, Mrs. C. L. M. Woodward; and, Caroline C. Marshal Woodward; October 12, 1828 – November 28, 1890) was a 19th-century American author. Her poems "The Old, Old Stairs" and "Dumb Voices" ranked her among the best writers of her day.

Biography
Caroline L. Marshall was born in Newmarket, New Hampshire, October 12, 1828. Her father. Capt. John Marshall, was a native of Concord, Massachusetts. She had at least two siblings, brothers, John H. and Thomas R.

At the age of eight, Woodward started a diary, which she never neglected, often writing in rhyme. 
On December 25, 1848, she married William W. Woodward, in Concord, New Hampshire. In 1852, they removed to Wooster, Ohio. There they buried their son, aged four years. They then removed to Fort Wayne, Indiana. Mr. Woodward was a railroad contractor. He, with his brother, M. E. Woodward, and Charles Fletcher, built a part of the Wabash Railroad. He also superintended the construction of the Pittsburg Railroad. 

In Fort Wayne, she commenced the study of French and German. Having mastered those languages, she turned her attention to oil painting, and started taking lessons. Believing that she was given improper instruction, she gave up her tuition and proceeded to learn art for herself. She also kept up her writing, becoming a contributor to some of the leading magazines of the country. Her poems "The Old, Old Stairs" and "Dumb Voices" ranked her among the best writers of her day.  

For the last 20 years of her life, Woodward resided at the "Wood Mansion" in Fort Wayne. She was sick for about two months before she died in Fort Wayne, November 28, 1890, age 62, of heart-failure, following an attack of influenza.

Notes

References

Attribution

External links
 

1828 births
1890 deaths
Wikipedia articles incorporating text from A Woman of the Century
19th-century American writers
19th-century American women writers
People from Newmarket, New Hampshire
Writers from New Hampshire
Writers from Fort Wayne, Indiana
Artists from Fort Wayne, Indiana